Western Heights High School is a state co-educational secondary school located in the northwestern suburbs of Rotorua, New Zealand. In April 2013, 1,887 students from Years 9 to 13 (ages 12 to 18) attended the school, including 1,172 students identifying as Māori – the largest Māori school roll in New Zealand in terms of number of students.

Western Heights High School offers Cambridge International Examinations in addition to the National Certificate of Educational Achievement (NCEA).

Notable alumni
 Cliff Curtis - actor
 Steve McDowall - rugby union player (Auckland, All Black)
 Temuera Morrison - actor
 Caleb Ralph - rugby union player (Crusaders, All Black)
 Hika Reid - rugby union player (All Black) and coach 
 Elias Scheres - netball player
 Buck Shelford - All Black captain
 Darrall Shelford - NZ Maori (rugby union), and Bradford Northern (rugby league) player

References

External links
School website

Secondary schools in the Bay of Plenty Region
Schools in Rotorua
Cambridge schools in New Zealand
New Zealand secondary schools of Nelson plan construction